Yeşilyazı can refer to:

 Yeşilyazı, Göynük
 Yeşilyazı, Hınıs